William Jennings Jefferson (born March 14, 1947) is an American former politician from Louisiana whose career ended after his corruption scandal and conviction. He served as a member of the U.S. House of Representatives for nine terms from 1991 to 2009 as a member of the Democratic Party. He represented , which includes much of the greater New Orleans area. He was elected as the state's first black congressman since the end of Reconstruction.

On November 13, 2009, Jefferson was sentenced to thirteen years in federal prison for bribery after a corruption investigation, the longest sentence ever given to a congressman. He began serving that sentence in May 2012 at a Federal Bureau of Prisons (BOP) facility in Beaumont, Texas.

He appealed his case after a U.S. Supreme Court ruling on similar issues. In light of these findings, on October 5, 2017, Jefferson was ordered released, pending sentencing or other action, after a U.S. District judge threw out 7 of 10 charges against him. On December 1, 2017, Judge T. S. Ellis III accepted his plea deal and sentenced Jefferson to time served.

Early life and family
Jefferson was born on March 14, 1947, in Lake Providence, the parish seat of East Carroll Parish in northeastern Louisiana.  He and his eight brothers and sisters worked alongside their father on their farm, and Jefferson was also a heavy-equipment operator for the United States Army Corps of Engineers. The Jeffersons were among the few African-American families in the area who in the mid-20th century owned their land (as opposed to sharecropping). They were regarded with respect, but the family struggled in poverty.

In 1969, Jefferson received a bachelor's degree from Southern University, a historically black college in Baton Rouge, where he had participated in Army ROTC. In 1969 he led a protest against substandard campus facilities and negotiated a resolution of the complaint with then-Governor John J. McKeithen. On graduation from Southern University, Jefferson was commissioned a second lieutenant in the United States Army; he served in a reserve capacity until 1975. In 1972, he earned a Juris Doctor from Harvard Law School. In 1996, he received a LLM in taxation from Georgetown University Law Center in Washington, D.C.

In 1972 and 1973 Jefferson began the practice of law, having initially served as a clerk for Judge Alvin Benjamin Rubin of the United States District Court for the Eastern District of Louisiana.

Jefferson is the brother of Betty Jefferson, who became assessor for New Orleans and a Democratic field operative; Mose Jefferson,  Archie Jefferson, and Brenda Jefferson Foster. He is the uncle of Angela Coleman.

Jefferson and his wife, Andrea Jefferson, have five daughters: Jamila Jefferson-Jones, Jalila Jefferson-Bullock (a former Louisiana State Representative), Jelani Jefferson Exum (a professor of law at the University of Toledo), Nailah Jefferson (a documentary filmmaker), and Akilah Jefferson. Jamila, Jalila, and Jelani are all graduates of Harvard College and Harvard Law School. Nailah is a graduate of Boston University and Emerson College. Akilah, a graduate of Brown University in Providence, Rhode Island, attends the Tulane University School of Medicine.

Political career in New Orleans
From 1973 to 1975, Jefferson was a legislative assistant to Democratic U.S. Senator J. Bennett Johnston of Louisiana. Jefferson moved to New Orleans in 1976 and was elected to the Louisiana Senate in 1979, where he served until 1990. He twice unsuccessfully ran for New Orleans mayor, having, along with Ron Faucheux, first challenged Dutch Morial in the election of 1982. He was defeated by Sidney Barthelemy in the mayoral runoff of 1986.  During the 1982 mayoral race, Morial attacked Jefferson by calling him "Dollar Bill". Jefferson was considered a rising star in Louisiana politics, with some suggesting he would be his state's second African-American governor.

In 1990, midway through his third term in the state senate, Jefferson ran in the nonpartisan blanket primary for Louisiana's 2nd congressional district seat after 10-term incumbent Lindy Boggs announced her retirement. He finished first in the seven-candidate field with 24 percent of the vote. In the runoff, he defeated Marc Morial, the son of Dutch Morial, with 52 percent of the vote. He was reelected seven times.

In the House, Jefferson joined the Congressional Black Caucus. He considered running for governor in 1995 but did not do so.

Jefferson ran for governor of Louisiana in the 1999 Louisiana gubernatorial election, and was the de facto "official" Democratic candidate. However, he lost badly to incumbent Republican Mike Foster, having tallied 29.5 percent of the vote and carrying only New Orleans (coextensive with Orleans Parish) and his native East Carroll Parish, whose seat is Lake Providence.

Local influence
Jefferson and his family controlled one of the most sophisticated and effective get-out-the-vote organizations in South Louisiana – the Progressive Democrats. Journalist Laura Maggi has described Mose Jefferson, a brother of William, as "the man responsible for running the Progressive Democrats street operation" in New Orleans.

His opponents, Ken Carter and Jim Singleton, founded the Black Organization for Leadership Development as an alternative group. In 2002, the Progressive Democrats' support helped elect Jefferson's protégée Renée Gill Pratt to the New Orleans City Council. Jefferson's daughter Jalila was defeated by Rosalind Peychaud in a special election for Gill Pratt's District 91 seat in the Louisiana State House. She defeated Peychaud in the next regular election. Jefferson's Progressive Democrats organization also contributed to the election of Jefferson's sister Betty, as a municipal assessor, in 1998, 2002 and 2006.

New Orleans politics substantially changed in the aftermath of Hurricane Katrina in 2005, as many former residents have never returned to the city, changing the demographics of voters. A few days after Hurricane Katrina, Jefferson was reported to have used a Louisiana National Guard detachment to recover personal effects and belongings from his home. After the truck in which he and the detachment traveled became stuck, the Guard helicopter aided Jefferson's party while rescue operations in the city were still underway.

2006 election

In the ensuing 2006 election cycle for Louisiana's 2nd congressional district, eight Democrats, three Republicans, and one Libertarian challengers stood for election against Jefferson. Jefferson had been named as a subject in a corruption probe.

None of the candidates obtained more than 50% of the vote on the first ballot (November 7, 2006), forcing a runoff. The two candidates who survived the first ballot were both African-American Democrats: Jefferson got 30% of the vote, and State Representative Karen Carter, who enjoyed support from the Louisiana Democratic Party’s establishment, picked up nearly all endorsements from local politicians and the local press; she gathered 22% of the vote. Carter was Jefferson's first credible challenger since his initial run for Congress.

Political commentators predicted an easy victory for Carter on the second ballot (to be held on December 9, 2006). In the last week of campaign, however, Jefferson Parish Sheriff Harry Lee, a law and order Democrat, urged voters against Carter. She had criticized the conduct of Gretna police officers and Jefferson Parish deputies in the aftermath of Katrina, as they had prevented evacuees from fleeing New Orleans. Lee mailed out 25,000 fliers and made public statements attacking Carter. The campaign generated much controversy, highlighting racial differences between the parishes.

Voter turnout dwindled from 24.15% to 16.25%. While residents of the city of New Orleans gave Jefferson a slight majority over Carter, (51% to 49%); the Jefferson Parish share of the district voted for Jefferson by a staggering 71% to 29%, clearly swinging the election in his favor.

Following Jefferson's reelection, Speaker-elect Nancy Pelosi announced that Jefferson would not regain his seat on the Ways and Means Committee as long as he is not "cleared of wrongdoing in an ongoing federal corruption probe".

2008 campaign
In 2008, Jefferson sought re-election while under indictment for bribery. Six Democrats challenged him for the seat in the Democratic primary. The voting was delayed due to Hurricane Gustav.

In the October 4, 2008 Democratic primary, opposition to Jefferson was split among seven contenders. Some of the challengers made strong showings in their base neighborhoods but failed to garner much support in other parts of the district. Jefferson ran second, third, or even fourth in many precincts, but his 25% total was enough to give him a plurality and to send him into the runoff primary, where he faced Helena Moreno, a former TV newscaster, on November 4. Aided by overwhelming support from African-American voters on the same date as the presidential candidacy of Barack Obama drew them to the polls in unprecedented numbers, Jefferson won the Democratic nomination in the congressional party primary, which barred the district's 41,000 Republicans and many of its 84,000 other voters not registered as Democrats. Jefferson won the November 4 Democratic runoff.

The general election round occurred on December 6, 2008. Jefferson faced Republican candidate Anh "Joseph" Cao, Green Party candidate Malik Rahim, and Libertarian Party candidate Gregory Kahn. An earlier candidate, independent Jerry Jacobs, withdrew.

Jefferson was defeated in the general election on December 6, 2008 in a major upset by Republican nominee Cao, who had endorsements from several prominent Democrats including Moreno and City Councilwomen Jacquelyn Brechtel Clarkson and Stacy Head. New Orleans Mayor Ray Nagin endorsed Jefferson. Cao won by three percentage points. Jefferson was the third Democratic incumbent since the end of Reconstruction to lose to a Republican at the federal level in Louisiana. (But in Louisiana as in other parts of the South, many conservative whites left the Democratic Party for the Republican Party, and alliances have shifted.)

Jefferson's loss evoked a sensation because of the overwhelmingly Democratic nature of the district; with a Cook Partisan Voting Index of D+28, it is the third-most Democratic district in the South. Democrats usually win local and state races in landslides.  Barack Obama carried the district with 72 percent of the vote in the 2008 presidential election.

Jefferson became the third African-American incumbent Congressman to be unseated in a general election.

Corruption case

In mid-2005, an investor in the Louisville, Kentucky-based IT firm iGate pled guilty to conspiracy to commit bribery and the payment of $400,000 in bribes to a public official — a then-unnamed member of the U.S. House of Representatives  later alleged to be Jefferson. In return for these bribes, the public official was alleged to have agreed to persuading the U.S. Army to test iGate's broadband two-way technology and other iGate products; influencing high-ranking officials in Nigeria, Ghana, and Cameroon; and meeting with personnel of the Export-Import Bank of the United States in order to facilitate potential financing for iGate business deals in those countries.

Based on these allegations, the FBI raided Jefferson's Congressional offices in May 2006. On June 4, 2007, a federal grand jury indicted Jefferson on sixteen felony charges related to corruption, including bribery, racketeering, conspiracy, money laundering, obstruction of justice and other offenses. Jefferson was defeated by Republican Joseph Cao on December 6, 2008, and became the most senior Democrat to lose re-election that year.

In 2009, he was tried in Virginia on federal corruption charges.  On August 5, 2009, he was found guilty of eleven of the sixteen corruption counts. On November 13, 2009, Jefferson was sentenced to thirteen years, the longest sentence given to a congressman for bribery or any other crime.

On March 26, 2012, the U.S. Court of Appeals for the Fourth Circuit affirmed Jefferson's conviction and sentence on ten of the eleven counts on which he was convicted. The Court of Appeals vacated and remanded the conviction on one count of the indictment, involving alleged wire fraud, holding that venue on that count was improper in the federal court in Virginia.

On April 20, 2012, U.S. District Court judge T. S. Ellis III revoked Jefferson's bail and ordered that he report to prison by May 4, 2012 to begin serving his thirteen-year sentence. He reported as ordered at the BOP facility in Beaumont, Texas. He was scheduled for release on August 30, 2023.

Jefferson owed $5 million in legal fees and filed for bankruptcy.  On May 1, 2015, Jefferson was permanently disbarred by the Supreme Court of Louisiana.

In the 2016 US Supreme Court case of McDonnell v. United States, the Court remanded the case to the lower court based on issues with the corruption charges against former Virginia Governor Bob McDonnell. The Justice Department has since dropped the case and will not prosecute again. Jefferson appealed and U.S. District Judge T. S. Ellis of the United States District Court for the Eastern District of Virginia threw out 7 of the most substantive of 10 charges against him on October 5, 2017: dropping convictions for "two counts of soliciting bribes, two counts of wire fraud, and three counts of money laundering."

The judge ordered him released while the government determined the sentence or plans for a retrial. On December 1, the government and Jefferson agreed that (1) given Judge Ellis' ruling dismissing some of the counts, one of the three remaining counts also had to be dismissed; and (2) given the time Jefferson already served in prison as well as the expense involved in continued litigation, the parties agreed that if on resentencing Judge Ellis imposed a sentence of time-served, neither party would take any further appeals from Judge Ellis' decision in which he dismissed most, but not all, of the counts against Jefferson. Judge Ellis subsequently sentenced the former congressman to time served, having spent five and a half years of his initial thirteen-year sentence in federal prison.

Charges against relatives
On May 22, 2009, Betty Jefferson, Mose Jefferson, Angela Coleman, and Mose's longtime companion, former New Orleans City Councilwoman Renée Gill Pratt, were indicted for violating the Racketeer Influenced and Corrupt Organizations (RICO) Act. On June 5, 2009, all the defendants pleaded not guilty. Their sister Brenda Jefferson Foster was serving as a witness in the government's case against them. Mose Jefferson is also facing a separate trial on charges of bribing Orleans Parish School Board president Ellenese Brooks-Simms.  On July 28, 2009, United States federal judge Ivan L. R. Lemelle delayed the start of the racketeering trial to January 25, 2010.

On January 10, 2010, Mose Jefferson was convicted of bribery and was sentenced to ten years imprisonment. On February 26, 2010, Betty Jefferson and Angela Coleman pleaded guilty to a single charge of conspiracy. They were expected to testify for the government in the fraud and corruption trial against Mose Jefferson and Pratt.

Electoral history
Mayor of New Orleans, 1982

Threshold > 50%

First Ballot, February 6, 1982

Second Ballot, March 20, 1982

Mayor of New Orleans, 1986

Threshold > 50%

First Ballot, February 1, 1986

Second Ballot, March 1, 1986

State Senator, 1987

Threshold > 50%

First Ballot, October 24, 1987

U. S. Representative, 2nd Congressional District, 1990

Threshold > 50%

First Ballot, October 6, 1990

Second Ballot, November 6, 1990

U. S. Representative, 2nd Congressional District, 1992

Threshold > 50%

First Ballot, October 3, 1992

U. S. Representative, 2nd Congressional District, 1994

Threshold > 50%

First Ballot, October 1, 1994

U. S. Representative, 2nd Congressional District, 1996

Threshold > 50%

First Ballot, September 21, 1996

U. S. Representative, 2nd Congressional District, 1998

Threshold > 50%

First Ballot, November 3, 1998

Governor of Louisiana, 1999

Threshold > 50%

First Ballot, October 23, 1999

U. S. Representative, 2nd Congressional District, 2000

Threshold > 50%

First Ballot, November 7, 2000

U. S. Representative, 2nd Congressional District, 2002

Threshold > 50%

First Ballot, November 5, 2002

U. S. Representative, 2nd Congressional District, 2004

Threshold > 50%

First Ballot, November 2, 2004

U. S. Representative, 2nd Congressional District, 2006

Threshold > 50%

First Ballot, November 7, 2006

Second Ballot, December 9, 2006

U. S. Representative, 2nd Congressional District, 2008

See also
List of African-American United States representatives
List of American federal politicians convicted of crimes
List of federal political scandals in the United States

Footnotes

External links

Jefferson Indictment, June 4, 2007, U.S. v. Jefferson, District Court for Eastern District of Virginia
 
 

|-

|-

|-

1947 births
Living people
20th-century African-American people
20th-century American criminals
21st-century African-American politicians
21st-century American criminals
21st-century American politicians
African-American members of the United States House of Representatives
African-American United States Army personnel
African-American state legislators in Louisiana
American prisoners and detainees
Baptists from Louisiana
Democratic Party members of the United States House of Representatives from Louisiana
Disbarred American lawyers
Georgetown University Law Center alumni
Harvard Law School alumni
Lawyers from New Orleans
Louisiana politicians convicted of crimes
Democratic Party Louisiana state senators
Members of the United States Congress stripped of committee assignment
People from Lake Providence, Louisiana
Politicians convicted of bribery under 18 U.S.C. § 201
Politicians convicted of racketeering
Politicians from New Orleans
Prisoners and detainees of the United States federal government
Southern University alumni
United States Army officers